Hideto Shigenobu (born 11 December 1954) is a Japanese professional golfer.

Shigenobu played on the Japan Golf Tour, winning five times.

Professional wins (5)

Japan Golf Tour wins (5)

1Co-sanctioned by the Asia Golf Circuit

Japan Golf Tour playoff record (2–3)

Team appearances
World Cup (representing Japan): 1993

External links

Japanese male golfers
Japan Golf Tour golfers
Sportspeople from Osaka Prefecture
1954 births
Living people